Gilbert Lloyd Harris (born June 18, 1984 in Manhattan, New York) is a former American football running back. After going undrafted in the 2006 NFL Draft, Harris was out of football until he was signed by the Kansas City Chiefs in 2007. He played college football at Arizona.

External links
Kansas City Chiefs bio

1984 births
Living people
People from Manhattan
American football fullbacks
Arizona Wildcats football players
Kansas City Chiefs players